Berndt Berndtsson is a Swedish sprint canoeist who competed in the late 1930s. He won two medals at the 1938 ICF Canoe Sprint World Championships in Vaxholm with a gold in the K-2 10000 m and a bronze in the K-4 1000 m events.

References

Possibly living people
Swedish male canoeists
Year of birth missing
ICF Canoe Sprint World Championships medalists in kayak